Nathaniel Jerome Meyohas (born May 29, 1974) is a French, London-based, businessman who is a founding partner of Blandford Capital. Until 2018 Nathaniel was a Partner at  Greybull Capital.

Biography
Meyohas was born in Paris, France to a Sephardi Jewish family. His sister is New York artist Sarah Meyohas. His brother is Marc Meyohas who is also a business partner. He attended Clifton College in Bristol, United Kingdom and is a graduate of the New York University Leonard N. Stern School of Business from where he received an MBA in 2001. Meyohas worked as an investment banker with Lehman Brothers from 1996 to 1999; and then as a principal with Sun Capital Partners from 2003 to 2010.

Personal life
Meyohas is married to Micheala Nahmad, daughter of art dealer Ezra Nahmad and sister of Helly Nahmad.

References 

French businesspeople
1974 births
Living people
French people of Jewish descent
New York University alumni
Lehman Brothers people
People educated at Clifton College
Nahmad family